Orlando García Niño (born 13 March 1995) is a Mexican footballer who plays as a defender for Saltillo.

References

1995 births
Living people
Mexican footballers
Association football defenders
Correcaminos UAT footballers
Atlético Reynosa footballers
Coras de Nayarit F.C. footballers
Gavilanes de Matamoros footballers
Ascenso MX players
Liga Premier de México players
Tercera División de México players
People from Ciudad Victoria
Footballers from Tamaulipas